Leonard Jacques Stein OBE (12 December 1887 – 23 April 1973), was a British political candidate, writer, barrister, Zionist activist, and President of the Anglo-Jewish Association.

Background
He was the son of Philip Stein and Matilda Beaver of Manchester. He was educated at St Paul's School, London and Balliol College, Oxford. In 1910 he was President of the Oxford Union. In 1928 he married Sarah Kitay of Paterson, New Jersey, USA. They had one son (and one son deceased). In 1953 he was made an Officer of the Order of the British Empire.

Professional career
In 1912 Stein received a Call to Bar, at the Inner Temple. He served in the Army from 1914  to 1920 (Staff-Captain, Palestine Military Administration and subsequently on Political Staff, EEF, in Jerusalem and at General Headquarters in Cairo from 1918 to 1920). He was Political Secretary of the World Zionist Organization from 1920 to 1929. He was Honorary Legal Adviser to the Jewish Agency for Palestine from 1929 to 1939. He was President of the Anglo-Jewish Association from 1939 to 1949. He was President of the Jewish Historical Society of England from 1964 to 1965.

Political career
Stein was firstly Liberal candidate for the Dover division of Kent at the 1922 General Election. This was a safe Unionist seat that a Liberal had not won since 1857. The Unionists held the seat. He was then Liberal candidate for the Kensington North division of London at the 1923 General Election. This was a Unionist seat and not a good prospect either as the Liberals had come third in 1922. However, he did manage to increase the Liberal share of the vote;

He did not contest the 1924 General Election.
He was then Liberal candidate for the Bermondsey West division of London at the 1929 General Election. This was a Labour seat that the Liberals had last won in 1923. He might have entertained hopes of regaining the seat, however the Unionists who had not run a candidate in 1923, chose to intervene. As a result, Labour comfortably held the seat;

He did not stand for parliament again. After the split in the Liberal Party in 1931 he was active in the National Liberals as Vice-Chairman of their London organisation.

Publications
Edition of the Vicar of Wakefield, 1912 
The truth about Palestine : a reply to the Palestine Arab delegation, 1922
Zionism, 1925, republished in new edition, 1932
Syria, 1926
(Joint) Tax Avoidance, 1936
The National Defence Contribution, 1937
The Excess Profits Tax, 1940
The Balfour Declaration, 1961
Weizmann and England, 1965 
(Joint Editor) Letters and Papers of Chaim Weizmann, Vol. I, 1968

References

External links 
Stein's 1929 election campaign in The Times
Stein's Obituary in The Times

1887 births
1973 deaths
Liberal Party (UK) parliamentary candidates
Alumni of Balliol College, Oxford
Jewish British politicians
Presidents of the Oxford Union
Members of the Inner Temple
Officers of the Order of the British Empire